Kathey Lichty (born 16 October 1957) is a Canadian rower. She competed in the women's eight event at the 1984 Summer Olympics.

References

External links
 

1957 births
Living people
Canadian female rowers
Olympic rowers of Canada
Rowers at the 1984 Summer Olympics
Sportspeople from North Bay, Ontario